Lam Chi Fung (born 30 December 2001) is a Hong Kong professional footballer who plays for Hong Kong Premier League club HK U23.

Career statistics

Club

Notes

References

Living people
2001 births
Hong Kong footballers
Association football forwards
Hong Kong First Division League players
Hong Kong Premier League players
Southern District FC players
Citizen AA players
HK U23 Football Team players